The Mongolian National Basketball Association (MNBA) is the top professional basketball league in Mongolia.

Current clubs

References

External links
Mongolian basketball at Asia-Basket.com

Videos
 Sengur brand presents MNBA "Super league" Top-10 actions (Youtube.com video)

Basketball competitions in Asia
Basketball leagues in Asia